Sheehan Mesa is a prominent mesa standing 10 miles (16 km) west-northwest of Pain Mesa in the northwest part of Mesa Range, Victoria Land. Named by the northern party of New Zealand Geological Survey Antarctic Expedition (NZGSAE), 1962–63, for Maurice Sheehan, field assistant with this party.

References

Mesas of Antarctica
Mountains of Victoria Land
Pennell Coast